Lessons from a School Shooting: Notes from Dunblane is a 2018 American short documentary film directed by Kim A. Snyder. The film features, in the wake of the 2012 Sandy Hook Elementary School shooting, local clergyman Father Bob Weiss, who shares his experience with a priest in Dunblane, Scotland, where a similar event took place in 1996.

The documentary was released on Netflix on September 28, 2018.

References

External links
 
 
 

2018 short documentary films
Netflix original documentary films
American short documentary films
Dunblane massacre
2010s English-language films
2010s American films